Michael Bloomfield may refer to:
 Michael J. Bloomfield (born 1959), American astronaut
 Mike Bloomfield (1943–1981), American guitarist